Bernie and the Gang is a Canadian comedy-drama film, directed by Marcel Carrière and released in 1977. The film centres on two brothers, Ti-Mine (Marcel Sabourin) and Bernie (Jean Lapointe), who concoct a get-rich-quick scheme in the hope of moving their family to Florida.

The cast also includes Rita Lafontaine, Anne-Marie Ducharme, Raymond Lévesque, Denise Proulx and Guy L'Écuyer.

References

External links

1977 films
1977 comedy-drama films
Canadian comedy-drama films
National Film Board of Canada films
Films set in Montreal
Films directed by Marcel Carrière
Films shot in Montreal
French-language Canadian films
1970s Canadian films